= Lvivskyi Sad =

Ukrainian agricultural company

- Industry: cultivation and processing of apples
- Founded: 2012
- Founder: Mykhailo Kupranets
- Website: https://gaderia.com.ua/

Lvivskyi Sad is an agricultural company specializing in the cultivation and processing of apples. The company also produces juices, vinegar and other products under brand GADERIA.

The company's products are sold in Ukraine and exported to Middle East, European Union, United Kingdom and other countries.

The founder and owner of the company is an entrepreneur from Lviv — Mykhailo Kupranets.

== History ==
The first orchard was laid out in 1996 on a 10-hectare plot of land in the Lviv region of Ukraine. It was started as a farm, which was to become a family business growing apples. In 2012, the company Lvivskyi Sad LLC was founded on its basis, functioning as a local apple producer for the local population and supplying the surrounding district until 2017. In 2017, in order to expand the enterprise, the company secured a loan of approximately 1 million euros from an external investor to increase the orchard area to 60 hectares of various apple varieties using intensive cultivation technology. Between 2017 and 2019, a storage facility using modern refrigeration technology was constructed, capable of storing 2,000 tons of produce year-round. Additionally, a state-of-the-art apple sorting line from the French manufacturer Maf Roda was launched.

After repaying the borrowed funds, the orchard became a family business in 2022, transitioning to management under a closed investment fund owned by the Kupranets family: Mykhailo, his wife and son. In 2018, along with growing and processing apples, the family foundation decided to develop a new business area - blueberry growing. To this end, Grona Agro LLC was established on 50 hectares of land in the north of Kyiv region, specialising in blueberry cultivation. Over seven years, the company achieved an annual planned yield of 50 tons of blueberries. The family fund owns a 65% stake in this company.

In 2023, the company put into operation a line for the production of natural direct-pressed juices from the Austrian manufacturer Voran under the Gaderia brand with the production capacity of the line is 100,000 litres per month. Gaderia juices have taken a leading position in the eco-products segment in Ukraine, and are also exported to the United Kingdom, Austria, the Baltic States, etc. on a regular basis.

From 2022 to 2024, Lvivskyi Sad took an active part in the state programme to support medium-sized agricultural businesses, thanks to which the orchard area was increased by 12 hectares of intensive orchard planting of the Gala apple variety, popular in the Middle East. The state of Ukraine compensated 50% of the orchard establishment costs within the framework of the national programme.
